"Ricordi" (English: "Memories") is a song by the Italian band Finley, from their studio album, Adrenalina 2.

Information 
The song was released as single on February 26, 2008 on iTunes and other digital stores. The song was written by the members of the band Danilo Calvio, Stefano Mantegazza, Marco Pedretti, Carmine Ruggiero, Daniele Persoglio.

The song participated on the Sanremo Music Festival 2008 and obtained the fifth place. In March 2008, the band released an English version of the song titled "Your Hero", featuring the Mexican singer Belinda. This version was included on the Belinda's second studio album, Utopía, as a bonus track on its international edition.

Video 
The music video of "Ricordi" shows the band singing in different places, while rotating images of people suffering without peace, featuring scenes with Belinda. In the music video of the English version, it shows the band and Belinda performing the song. This version was released on iTunes on May 5, 2008.

Track listing

Charts

References 

2008 singles
2008 songs
English-language Italian songs
Belinda Peregrín songs
Italian pop songs
EMI Records singles
Sanremo Music Festival songs